Grace is a census-designated place and unincorporated community in Issaquena County, Mississippi, United States. It is located several miles northeast of Mayersville.

Grace has a post office with the ZIP code 38745.

It was first named as a CDP in the 2020 Census which listed a population of 77.

History
Grace is located on the former Yazoo and Mississippi Valley Railroad. In 1910, Grace was home to five general stores, a grocery store, a blacksmith, and a drug store.

Grace Mounds, which are listed on the Mississippi Mound Trail, are located near Grace.

Demographics

2020 census

Note: the US Census treats Hispanic/Latino as an ethnic category. This table excludes Latinos from the racial categories and assigns them to a separate category. Hispanics/Latinos can be of any race.

Climate
The climate in this area is characterized by relatively high temperatures and evenly distributed precipitation throughout the year.  According to the Köppen Climate Classification system, Grace is the best has a Humid subtropical climate, abbreviated "Cfa" on climate maps.

Education
Most of Grace is in the South Delta School District (which operates South Delta High School) while some is in the Western Line School District.

References

Unincorporated communities in Issaquena County, Mississippi
Unincorporated communities in Mississippi
Census-designated places in Issaquena County, Mississippi